Peter D. Pitt (born 22 July 1927) is a British film editor. He was born in Hendon.

Selected filmography
 The Hostage (1956)
 Port of Escape (1956)
 Face in the Night (1957)
 Naked Fury (1959)
 Make Mine a Million (1959)
 Operation Cupid (1960)
 Three Spare Wives (1962)
 The Spanish Sword (1962)
 The Haunted House of Horror (1969)
 A Warm December  (1970)
 Secrets of a Superstud (1976)

References

External links
 

1927 births
Possibly living people
British film editors
People from Hendon